Cneorane elegans ( or ) is a leaf beetle species in the genus Cneorane found in Japan and Korea.

References

 VI. Catalogue of the Phytophagous Coleoptera of Japan, with descriptions of the species new to science. Joseph S Baly, Transactions of The Royal Entomological Society of London 22: 161-217 (1874)

External links

ubio.org
nature.go.kr

Galerucinae
Beetles described in 1874
Taxa named by Joseph Sugar Baly